Hurstpierpoint College is a public school (English private boarding and day school), located just to the north of the village of Hurstpierpoint, West Sussex. The College was founded in 1849 by Canon Nathaniel Woodard and is a member of the Woodard Corporation.

History and overview
The school was established in 1849 as St John's Middle School, based in Shoreham. Its first headmaster, Edward Clarke Lowe, had worked with Woodard at Lancing College and stayed at Hurstpierpoint for 22 years until 1872. The school moved to Mansion House in Hurstpierpoint and then, thanks to the local benefactors the Campion family, on 21 June 1853 made its move to the present site. Intended to resemble the collegiate system at Oxford and Cambridge, Nathaniel Woodard designed the College to have adjoining Inner and Outer quads and the chapel and dining hall adjacent to each other.

The school was inspected by the Independent Schools Inspectorate in 2019.

Houses
In the early 70s the senior school comprised just seven houses, named: Eagle, Martlet, Shield, Red Cross, Chevron, Fleur de Lys and Star. Each house had a house master and house tutor who were also teachers within the school.

Since then, the number of senior school houses have grown in size alongside the school's expansion. It now consists of 13 houses. 6 boys houses (Star, Chevron, Crescent, Eagle, Red Cross and Woodard) and 6 girl's houses (Fleur de Lys, Wolf, Phoenix, Shield, Martlet and Pelican), with the 13th house being the co-educational day and boarding 'hall of residence', St John's House - which all students in their last year (Upper Sixth) join, whilst retaining affiliation to their former houses.

Traditions

The school preserves ceremonies, such as the 'Boar's Head Procession' and the 'Wolstonbury Service' which for the most part were taken from other schools such as Winchester College, in order to give the school a feeling of tradition back in its early Victorian days.

"Hurst" has performed a Shakespeare play every year since 1854, beginning with Richard III after the first headmaster, Dr Lowe inspired the first players onto stage. Hurstpierpoint College boasts the oldest Shakespeare society in existence, older even than that of the Royal Shakespeare Company which was not formed until 1875.

The Hurst Johnian, the school magazine, founded in May 1858 is a source for the School's history. Its policy has been to maintain the annals of the school, and it continues to publish current reports and articles on the past. Evidence from the national archives suggests that it is the oldest school magazine in the country.

Notable Masters
Sabine Baring-Gould: Novelist and composer of hymns, the most notable being "Onward, Christian Soldiers". He was a Master of the College from 1855 to 1864. Baring-Gould had an eccentric reputation, and archives tell how he would teach with a bat on his shoulder and took weird holidays, bringing home a pony from Iceland, which lived for years in the North Field. Whilst the Hymn is thought to have been written in Yorkshire in 1865, a story recounts how Baring-Gould (known as "Snout") on one occasion gave a pupil of the College thirty-six (sic) cuts, and then washed his hands and sat down and wrote "Onward Christian Soldiers." A talented artist, he made and painted (well heraldically) the coat of arms of the Prince of Wales, which for many years appeared in the proscenium. Baring-Gould designed the cover of the Johnian (the College's publication), and designed the bookshelves and cases with their wrought iron, originally red and gold, in the Boys' Library. He also painted the window jambs with scenes from the "Canterbury Tales" and the "Faery Queen", and probably did work for the Fellows' Library. In 1860 he was one of the "Hurst Rifle Volunteers," who used to drill at the New Inn, which lead Hurst to be one of the founding Combined Cadet Forces schools.
Thomas Fielden (musician): He was a famous Director of Music at Hurst, Charterhouse and Fettes, as well as a noted pianist, and Professor of Pianoforte at the Royal College of Music for over 30 years.
Percy Henn: Noted clergyman and teacher in England and later Western Australia.

Notable Old Johnians
Past students of Hurstpierpoint College are referred to as 'Old Johnians'; for details of notable alumni see Old Johnians.

Headmasters

 Edward Clarke Lowe (1849–1872) 
 William Awdry (1873–1879) 
 Charles Cooper (1880–1902) 
 Arthur Coombes (1902–1923) 
 Henry Bernard Tower (1924–1937) 
 Walter Dingwall (1937–1945) 
 Ronald Howard (1945–1964) 
 Roger Griffiths (1964–1986) 
 Simon Watson (1986–1995) 
 Stephen Meek (1995–2004) 
 Tim Manly (2005–present)

Southern Railway Schools Class
The school lent its name to the nineteenth steam locomotive (Engine 918) in the Southern Railway's Class V of which there were 40. This Class was also known as the Schools Class because all 40 of the class were named after prominent English Public Schools. 'Hurstpierpoint', as it was called, was built in 1934 and was withdrawn in 1961. Its nameplate is now housed in the School's Science Block.

Coat of Arms

References

External links

 Hurstpierpoint College website
 schoolsguidebook
 ISI Inspection Reports - Prep School & Senior School
 Alumni Website www.TheOJClub.com

Anglo-Catholic educational establishments
Educational institutions established in 1849
Boarding schools in West Sussex
Private schools in West Sussex
Woodard Schools
 
Mid Sussex District
Member schools of the Headmasters' and Headmistresses' Conference
Co-educational boarding schools
1849 establishments in England
Church of England private schools in the Diocese of Chichester
International Baccalaureate schools in England